Shalako may refer to:

 Shalako, an annual Native American festival
 Shalako (novel), by Louis L'Amour
 Shalako (film)
 Shalakó, another name for the pith helmet